Digital collaboration is using digital technologies for collaboration. Dramatically different from traditional collaboration, it connects a broader network of participants who can accomplish much more than they would on their own. Digital Collaboration is used in many fields, for example digital collaboration in classrooms.

Examples
 Online meetings and webinars
 Online team chatrooms
 Co-authoring documents and shared spreadsheets
 Social media
 Shared task lists or issue tracking systems
 Wikis
 Email
 Digital Collaboration in Classrooms

Background
21st century mobile devices such as apps, social media, bandwidth and open data, connect people on a global level. This has led to an increase in information and at the same time increased levels of stress. As a result, workplace innovators and visionaries want to discover new digital tools and are rethinking how, when and where they work.

Processes

E-mail 

A collaborative system through electronic devices which allows users to exchange messages and information online by way of computer, tablet, or smartphone. Users develop accounts and use E-mail for work and leisure related topics. A great reliance is placed on e-mail to communicate, gone are the days when a message can go unread. Adapting digital tools such as notetaking apps, task lists and ical to David Allen's Getting Things Done (GTD) productivity workflow, users can find "weird time", to process the e-mail in box. GTD principles can be difficult to maintain over the long term. Examples of providers for e-mail are Gmail, Comcast, and Outlook.

Social media 

Social Media networks foster collaboration as well as manage and share knowledge between peers and interested groups. Participation in these networks builds trust among peers, which leads to open sharing of ideas. News and information can be activity filtered through subscription, allowing users to focus on what interests them, as opposed to passively receiving information. Events, activities, files and discussions are searchable and presented as a timeline. Platforms such as Facebook, Twitter, and Instagram bring users together by connecting them on the internet.

Open data sources 

Applications that can deliver data to help make decisions. Public agencies and GIS services provide, what was once thought of as proprietary data, to the private sector developers to present useful context and decision-making. People themselves can also provide data about their location or experience, which has social value to interested users.

Wikis 

Wikis are websites which allow collaborative modification of its content and structure directly from the web browser. In a typical wiki, text is written using a simplified markup language (known as "wiki markup"), and often edited with the help of a rich-text editor. A wiki is run using wiki software, otherwise known as a wiki engine. There are dozens of different wiki engines in use, both standalone and part of other software, such as bug tracking systems. Some wiki engines are open source, whereas others are proprietary.

Identity and adoption

Innovators and visionaries of both Generations X and Y are leading the mainstream pragmatist to digitally collaborative tools.
The Net Generation is growing up with digital collaborative tools such as Wikipedia, Twitter, Facebook, Flipboard and Pinterest, building trust among peers and openness in their online communities. Influenced by cautious optimism about employment, post turbulent 2008 economy, and trust among peers, this generation will culturally tend to share and sustain resources. These factors contribute to increased adoption of digitally collaborative tools and active participation over the previous Generation X.

See also

 Cloud collaboration
 Collaborative consumption
 Collaborative editing
 Collaborative software
 Collaborative writing
 Commons-based peer production
 Document collaboration
 Mass collaboration
 Open collaboration
 Open-source model
 Open-source software movement

References

Further reading
 
 
 

Knowledge management
Collaboration
Digital technology